George Washington Glick is a marble sculpture depicting the American politician of the same name by Charles Henry Niehaus, formerly installed in Washington, D.C. as part of the National Statuary Hall Collection. The statue, which was gifted by the U.S. state of Kansas in 1914, was replaced with one depicting Dwight D. Eisenhower in 2003.

References

1914 sculptures
Formerly in the National Statuary Hall Collection
Marble sculptures in the United States
Sculptures of men in the United States
Statues in the United States